John Lucas (24 June 1818 – 1 March 1902) was a builder and politician in colonial New South Wales, a member of both the Legislative Assembly and Legislative Council.

Early life
He was educated at a Church of England school in Liverpool, and Captain Beveridge's boarding school. He left school to be apprenticed as a carpenter, the trade of his grandfather Nathaniel Lucas.

Political career
He first stood for the Legislative Assembly at the 1859 election for Canterbury, but was unsuccessful. He won the seat at the 1860 by-election, holding it at the 1860 general election. In December 1864 he was elected to both Canterbury, and Hartley, choosing to represent Hartley. He was defeated in an attempt to return to Canterbury at the election in December 1869. He regained a seat in the assembly at the 1871 Canterbury by-election, serving until his retirement in 1880. His only ministerial appointment was as Secretary for Mines in the third Robertson ministry from February 1875 until March 1877. He was appointed to the Legislative Council in 1880 and served until his death.

Personal life

He was noted patron of the Jenolan Caves in the Blue Mountains where a cave and a tour have since been named in his honour. He also maintained a holiday cottage on Lapstone Hill at the Eastern edge of the Blue Mountains. On the original Lapstone Zig Zag a station was built for him and named . The remains of the station are still visible today.

References

External links
 Photograph of John Lucas at the National Library of Australia https://nla.gov.au/nla.pic-an23460676
 

1818 births
1902 deaths
Members of the New South Wales Legislative Council
Members of the New South Wales Legislative Assembly
19th-century Australian politicians